Adenylyl cyclase-associated protein 1 is an enzyme that in humans is encoded by the CAP1 gene.

The protein encoded by this gene is related to the Saccharomyces cerevisiae CAP protein, which is involved in the cyclic AMP pathway. The human protein is able to interact with other molecules of the same protein, as well as with CAP2 and actin.

Interactions
CAP1 has been shown to interact with ACTG1 and CAP2.

See also
 Adenylyl cyclase

References

External links

Further reading